Daniil Olegovich Dilman (born 26 February 1996) is a Russian snowboarder. He competed in the 2018 Winter Olympics.

References

1996 births
Living people
Snowboarders at the 2018 Winter Olympics
Russian male snowboarders
Olympic snowboarders of Russia
Universiade silver medalists for Russia
Universiade medalists in snowboarding
Competitors at the 2019 Winter Universiade